The Tampa Bay Stakes is a Grade III American Thoroughbred horse race for horses four years old or older, run over a distance of  miles on the turf held annually in early February at Tampa Bay Downs, Oldsmar, Florida. The event currently carries a purse of $175,000.

History 
The race was inaugurated in 9 April 1985 and was run on the dirt track over a distance of 6 furlongs. The following year the race was not held.

In 1987 the event received sponsorship from the Breeders' Cup and Budweiser and was renewed at a new distance of  miles on the dirt track. Budweiser terminated its sponsorship in 1996 and this affected the stakes of the event. The Breeders' Cup also removed their sponsorship but much later in 2006.

The first running of the event on the turf was in 1999.

In 2011 the event was upgraded to a Grade III event.

The 2018 winner of the event, US Champion Male Turf Horse World Approval of 2017 resumed after winning the 2017 Breeders' Cup Mile starting as the overwhelming 1/5on favorite.

Records

Speed record: 
 miles – 1:39.65 Legs Galore (1999)

Margins:
 lengths  – Delay of Game (2000)

Most wins:
 2 – Gallant Mel (1989, 1991)
 2 – Lord John (1992, 1993)
 2 – Delay of Game (2000, 2001)
 2 – Burning Roma (2003, 2004)
 2 – Inspector Lynley (2017, 2019)

Most wins by a jockey:
 3 – Ricardo D. Lopez  (1989, 1990, 1991)
 3 – William T. Henry  (1993, 1995, 1999)

Most wins by a trainer:
 3 – George R. Arnold II  (2000, 2001, 2010)
 3 – Claude R. McGaughey III (2016, 2017, 2019)

Most wins by an owner:
 2 – D. Edwards & M. W. Mitchell (1989, 1991)
 2 – John E. Callaway  (1992, 1993)
 2 – John H. Peace  (2000, 2001)
 2 – Harold L. Queen  (2003, 2004)
 2 – Stuart S. Janney III & Phipps Stable (2017, 2019)
 2 – WinStar Farm (2011, 2023)

Winners

Legend:

See also
List of American and Canadian Graded races

References

Graded stakes races in the United States
Grade 3 stakes races in the United States
Recurring sporting events established in 1985
Turf races in the United States
Sports competitions in Tampa, Florida
1985 establishments in Florida